George Carter may refer to:

Sportspeople
George Carter (basketball) (1944–2020), basketball player
George Carter (footballer, born 1867) (1867–1945), Southampton footballer and coach
George Carter (footballer, born 1900) (1900–1981), West Ham United footballer
George Carter (Australian footballer) (1910–1971), Australian footballer for Collingwood and Hawthorn
George Carter (rugby union) (1854–1922), New Zealand rugby union player
George Carter (cricketer, born 1846), English cricketer
George Carter (Essex cricketer) (1901–1994), English cricketer
George Carter (Bengal cricketer) (1908–1982), English cricketer
George Carter (bowls) (1883–1935), New Zealand lawn bowls player

Politicians
George Carter (New South Wales politician) (1841–1891), member of the New South Wales Legislative Assembly
George Carter (Queensland politician) (1864–1932), member of the Queensland Legislative Assembly
George R. Carter (1866–1933), Territorial Governor of Hawaii

Others
George Carter III (born 1945)
George L Carter Theoretical Astrophysicist
George Carter (engineer) (1889–1969), aircraft designer at Gloster
George Carter I (1777–1846), Virginia plantation owner
George Carter (artist) (1737–1795), painter
George F. Carter (1912–2004), American geographer and anthropologist
George Lafayette Carter (1857–1936), American entrepreneur
George Bertram Carter (1896–1986), English architect
George Stuart Carter (1893–1969), British zoologist
George Ethelbert Carter, first Canadian-born black judge
George Carter (musician), American blues musician
George Carter-Campbell (1869–1921), British General
George Carter, fictional character on the Australian soap opera Neighbours